Jamie Docherty was a Scottish professional footballer who played as a forward. He played for Forfar Athletic before joining newly formed Dundee Hibernian in June 1909. He was Dundee Hibernian's first scorer when he netted the equaliser in their first friendly match. Docherty spent two season at Tannadice and returned in December 1912 to play one further match after a spell at Partick Thistle. It is unknown where he went after leaving the club for a second time.

References

Dundee United F.C. players
Scottish footballers
Year of birth unknown
Year of death unknown
Place of death unknown
Association football forwards
Partick Thistle F.C. players
Forfar Athletic F.C. players
Scottish Football League players